28th Ruler was an ajaw of the Maya city of Tikal. He ruled c.766-768. Little is known about this ruler. He was a son of 27th ruler of Tikal Yik'in Chan K'awiil and elder brother of his successor 29th ruler Yax Nuun Ahiin II.

Footnotes

References

Rulers of Tikal
8th century in the Maya civilization
8th-century monarchs in North America
Year of birth unknown
Year of death unknown
8th century in Guatemala